Exorcism is the religious practice of evicting demons or other spiritual entities from a person believed to be possessed.
Exorcism in Christianity
Minor exorcism in Christianity
Exorcism in the Catholic Church
Puritan exorcism
Exorcism in Islam

Exorcism may also refer to:
"Exorcism" (song) by Killing Joke
Exorcism, a 1974 Spanish horror film starring Paul Naschy
Exorcism: The Possession of Gail Bowers, a 2006 horror film

See also

Exercism, an online coding platform
Exorcist (disambiguation)